The 2017–18 Arizona State Sun Devils women's basketball team represented Arizona State University during the 2017–18 NCAA Division I women's basketball season. The Sun Devils, led by 21st year head coach Charli Turner Thorne, played their games at the Wells Fargo Arena and are members of the Pac-12 Conference. They finished the season 22–13, 10–8 in Pac-12 play to finish in sixth place. They advanced to the semifinals of the Pac-12 women's tournament where they lost to Stanford. They received an at-large bid to the NCAA women's tournament where they defeated Nebraska in the first round before losing to Texas in the second round.

Previous season
They finished the season 20–13, 9–9 in Pac-12 play to finish in fifth place. They advanced to the quarterfinals of the Pac-12 women's tournament where they lost to UCLA. They received at-large bid of the NCAA women's tournament where they defeated Michigan State in the first round before losing to South Carolina in the second round.

Roster

Schedule

|-
!colspan=9 style=| Non-conference regular season

|-
!colspan=9 style=| Pac-12 regular season

|-
!colspan=9 style=| Pac-12 Women's Tournament

|-
!colspan=9 style=| NCAA Women's Tournament

Rankings
2017–18 NCAA Division I women's basketball rankings

See also
2017–18 Arizona State Sun Devils men's basketball team

References

Arizona State Sun Devils women's basketball seasons
Arizona State
Arizona State Sun Devils women's basketball
Arizona State Sun Devils women's basketball
Arizona State